Cornelius O'Callaghan, 1st Viscount Lismore PC (I) (2 October 1775 – 30 May 1857) was an Irish Whig politician.

He was the son of Cornelius O'Callaghan, 1st Baron Lismore and Frances Ponsonby. He succeeded to his father's title on 12 July 1797 and assumed his seat in the Irish House of Lords. On 30 May 1806 he was created Viscount Lismore in the Peerage of Ireland.

From 1806 to 1807 he sat in the House of Commons of the United Kingdom as a Member of Parliament (MP) for Lostwithiel, a rotten borough in Cornwall controlled by Lord Mount Edgcumbe.

In 1835 he was made a Member of the Privy Council of Ireland. In 1838 he was made Baron Lismore in the Peerage of the United Kingdom, giving him and his descendants an automatic seat in the British House of Lords. He served as Lord Lieutenant of Tipperary between 20 October 1851 and his death in 1857.

He married Lady Eleanor Butler, daughter of John Butler, 17th Earl of Ormonde and Lady Frances Susan Elizabeth Wandesford, on 11 August 1808. They divorced in 1826. He was succeeded in his title by his third and only surviving son, George O'Callaghan.

The 1st Viscount of Lismores son Cornelius O'Callaghan (1809–1849) who pre-deceased him, served as MP for Tipperary and Dungarvan in the House of Commons.

References

External links 
 

|-

1775 births
1857 deaths
Lord-Lieutenants of Tipperary
Members of the Irish House of Lords
Members of the Privy Council of Ireland
Cornelius
Viscounts in the Peerage of Ireland
Eldest sons of British hereditary barons
UK MPs 1806–1807
UK MPs who inherited peerages
UK MPs who were granted peerages
Members of the Parliament of the United Kingdom for constituencies in Cornwall
Whig (British political party) MPs for English constituencies
Peers of the United Kingdom created by Queen Victoria